Methyloterrigena is a genus of bacteria from the family of Devosiaceae with one known species (Methyloterrigena soli).

References

Hyphomicrobiales
Monotypic bacteria genera
Bacteria genera